Copper is a chemical element with the symbol Cu (from Latin: cuprum) and the atomic number of 29. It is easily recognisable, due to its distinct red-orange color. Copper also has a range of different organic and inorganic salts, having varying oxidation states ranging from (0,I) to (III). These salts (mostly the (II) salts) are often blue to green in color, rather than the orange color copper is known for. Despite being considered a semi-noble metal, copper is one of the most common salt-forming transition metals, along with iron.

Copper(0,I) salts

Copper(I) salts

Copper(II) salts

Copper(I, II) salts

Copper(III) salts

See also 

 List of organic salts
 List of inorganic compounds

Copper
Copper(I) compounds
Copper(II) compounds
Copper complexes
Copper salts